Man Alive is a Canadian television program about faith and spirituality. It took its name from a poem by St. Irenaeus, a 2nd-century Bishop of Lyon who wrote: The glory of God is man fully alive, and the life of man is the vision of God. The program debuted in 1967 on CBC Television, and was hosted by Roy Bonisteel for more than two decades. After several seasons of co-productions with Vision TV and the Life Network, the last episode aired on CBC Television on December 17, 2000.

Bonisteel retired in 1989, and was replaced by Peter Downie who left in 1993. Arthur Kent succeeded Downie for one season, and then R. H. Thomson hosted until the program was cancelled.

Man Alive took a diverse non-denominational approach to religious and spiritual matters. The program covered a wide range of topics: nuclear war, UFOs, Holocaust survivors, sexual abuse, Third World development, family relationships, people with disabilities, the Vatican Bank scandal and profiles of religious figures such as Mother Teresa, Desmond Tutu and the Dalai Lama.

References

External links
 Queen's University Directory of CBC Television Series (Man Alive archived listing link via archive.org)
 Museum of Broadcast Communications: Man Alive
  Man Alive segment; last updated 7 April 2005.
 CBC Digital Archives – Man Alive

Canadian religious television series
Religious mass media in Canada
CBC Television original programming
1967 Canadian television series debuts
2000 Canadian television series endings
1960s Canadian documentary television series
1970s Canadian documentary television series
1980s Canadian documentary television series
1990s Canadian documentary television series
2000s Canadian documentary television series